Chaenothecopsis polissica is a species of fossilized pin lichen in the family Mycocaliciaceae that was discovered in 2021 by Vasyl Heluta and Maryna Sukhomlyn. The holotype was recovered from Rovno amber, which formed in the Ukraine during the late Eocene.

References

Lichen species
Lichens described in 2021
Lichens of Eastern Europe
Prehistoric fungi
Eurotiomycetes